Rail Baltica is a greenfield rail transport infrastructure project with a goal to integrate the Baltic states in the European rail network. Its purpose is to provide passenger and freight service between participating countries and improve rail connections between Central and Northern Europe, specifically the area in the Southeast of the Baltic sea. Furthermore, it is intended to be a catalyst for building the economic corridor in Northeastern Europe. The project envisages a continuous rail link from Tallinn (Estonia) to Warsaw (Poland). Rail Baltica is one of the priority projects of the European Union. It is part of the North Sea–Baltic Corridor of the Trans-European Transport Networks (TEN-T).

Rail Baltica will add the first large-scale mainline standard gauge railway in the area, while the legacy rail networks in Finland, Estonia, Latvia and Lithuania are mainly in Russian gauge (their first lines were built in the second half of the 19th century while these countries were under Russian and later Soviet rule, and the railways which had been built or converted in narrow or standard gauge in the independent or German-occupied Baltic states between World War I and World War II have been converted to Russian gauge after 1945 by the Soviet Union).

According to a study produced by Ernst & Young, the measurable socio-economic benefits are estimated at 16.2 billion euros. The assessed GDP multiplier effect the Rail Baltica Global Project would create is an additional 2 billion euros. According to the same study, Rail Baltic will save an estimated 400 human lives in the span of 29 years. As of January 2020, the high-speed railway connection from Tallinn to the Lithuanian-Polish border was expected to be completed by 2026. As of June 2020, the undersea railway tunnel between Tallinn and Helsinki was envisioned to be completed around mid-2026. At the end of April 2021, governments of Estonia and Finland signed a Memorandum of Understanding committing themselves to cooperation in the area of transport. As of February 2023, the tunnel was still at the investigative stage.

Overview

Proposed environmental impact 
Rail Baltica will be an electric railway, motivated by a desire to reduce carbon emissions. The railway has been planned to avoid Natura 2000 protected areas, in addition to minimising impacts on other environmentally-sensitive protected areas, and existing 1,520 mm gauge railway networking areas. Wherever necessary, noise protection barriers will be installed. Special animal passages will be built through the embankment.

Stations 
The railway project will enable intermodality and multimodality (i.e. transportation of freight through two or more methods of transportation). Rail Baltica includes plans for three multimodal freight terminals which will be located in Muuga Harbour (Estonia), Salaspils (Latvia), and Kaunas (Lithuania). This is intended to create synergies with the existing 1,520 mm railway system infrastructure. There will be seven international passenger stations in Tallinn, Pärnu, Riga, Riga Airport, Panevežys, Kaunas, and Vilnius, with potential regional stations and connections to airports and seaports.

Parameters

Rail Baltica will be built as a new, publicly owned, fast conventional double-track railway. If the railway runs freight trains it will be quadruple-track. It will be electrified and equipped with the European Rail Traffic Management System (ERTMS) for signalling and communications. The new railway line will be designed with a  gauge. Other key technical parameters include the following:
 The maximum freight train length will be .
 The maximum axle load will be .
 No level crossings with roads
 For maintenance and emergency services, access to the main line should be every  and in specific areas.
 The railway will have ballasted track.
 Its energy system should be 25 kV.
 Its double track side should be right-hand running.
 It is ERTMS Level 2, Baseline 3.

Its parameters are in accordance with the EU Technical Specifications for Interoperability (TSI – P2, F1).

The design phase began in 2016, with design activities at the Riga Central Passenger Station and the Riga International Airport passenger station in Latvia to be continued till 2023. Meanwhile, the construction of the Rail Baltica infrastructure is planned to start in 2019 and should be completed in 2026.

The section from Helsinki to Tallinn will be operated by existing commercial ferries. In the future, a proposed Helsinki to Tallinn Tunnel could provide a rail link between the two cities. The length of the railway between Tallinn and Warsaw will be at least . Total length of the Baltic railway part will be .

Status
In 2017, all three Baltic parliaments ratified the Inter-Governmental Agreement for the Rail Baltica project, thereby confirming their long-term commitment to the Rail Baltica project. In addition, Rail Baltica Global Project's cost-benefit analysis was delivered by Ernst & Young and Atkins International experts, based on the European Union's CBA guidelines, proving that the project is financially feasible and viable, and its measurable benefits will outweigh the costs.

On 14 February 2018, the Ministry of Public Administration of the Republic of Estonia approved the spatial plan for the Rail Baltica railway in Estonia, leading to the setting of the final route and preliminary design of the railway in this northern Baltic State. The spatial planning for the entire line was approved in Latvia by the decision of the Latvian Government in August 2016, and followed by the approval of the Lithuanian Government in January 2017 for their respective section from Kaunas to the Lithuanian-Latvian border in Lithuania (The route for the section Kaunas–Lithuania/Poland State border, known as Rail Baltica I, is subject to the results of the Upgrade Feasibility study). In the light of Estonia's decision, the spatial territorial planning and preliminary technical design of the Rail Baltica railway in the Baltic States has been finalised. 

The Rail Baltica project has entered the design phase in all three Baltic States with the approval of the Detailed Design Guidelines for Rail Baltica. For certain sections the work on the consolidated preliminary technical design, tendering the detailed technical design services and preparation of BIM strategy has finished. On 20 March 2018, the first Rail Baltica construction design and supervision contract of Rail Baltica's Riga International Airport railway station, related infrastructure and viaduct was signed by "Eiropas Dzelzceļa līnijas" SIA and the winner of the open International tender – partnership of suppliers from three countries "PROSIV" ("Sintagma" (Italy), "Prodex" (Slovakia) and "Vektors T" (Latvia)).

In 2018, the long-term Business Plan, Operational Plan, the Upgraded Feasibility Study of the European gauge railway line from Kaunas to Lithuanian/Polish border, Infrastructure Management Study and other studies related to commercialisation and supply materials were finalized. In 2019, the first cornerstone of Rail Baltica was laid in Estonia to mark the beginning of construction of Saustinõmme viaduct. Also, detailed technical design contracts for the sections Tallinn-Rapla and Pärnu-Rapla in Estonia, Kaunas-Ramygala and Ramygala-Latvian/Lithuanian border in Lithuania, Vangaži-Salaspils-Misa and main line through Riga in Latvia were signed. With the contracts signed, geotechnical research was started in different sections of the railway in order to gather information about the soil.

In Latvia, the Riga Central Station construction was officially started with ceremonies on 23 November 2020. On the 3rd of February 2021 the project implementer of Riga Airport Station has also been chosen and construction began in May 2021, construction will finish in early 2023. Technical with NGOs in Riga have been started, to discuss the project technical solutions, especially crossings, overpasses and other infrastructure elements in the city.

In Estonia, discussions about Environmental Impact assessment have been started and several meetings are planned until the end of 2020. During the discussions, people are invited to ask questions regarding the upcoming changes in environment, while various technical solutions are presented.

Project implementers 
The Rail Baltica project is being implemented by the three Baltic States – Estonia, Latvia and Lithuania. Finland announced in February 2019 that it will also join the project.

The beneficiaries of the Rail Baltica project are ministries of the three Baltic States – Estonia's Ministry of Economic Affairs and Communications, Latvia's Ministry of Transport and Lithuania's Ministry of Transport and Communications. In 2014 they established a joint venture RB RAIL AS to be the Main Coordinator and project implementer for the purpose of completing the railway and developing the Rail Baltica project. Its main business is the design, construction and marketing of the railway. RB Rail AS also submits EU financing proposals for the Rail Baltica purchasing body for all parties for the procurement of studies, plans, designs for the global project, sub-systems (control, command, and signalling and energy/electrification), raw materials and key components, and cross-border track sections.

Rail Baltic Estonia OU in Estonia, Eiropas Dzelzceļa līnijas SIA in Latvia, Rail Baltica statyba UAB and Lietuvos Geležinkeliu Infrastruktūra in Lithuania are the national Implementing Bodies. All construction carried out by the implementing bodies is done under the supervision of RB Rail AS and is based on common procurement principles, rules and contract templates.

Financing

The total estimated cost of the Rail Baltica Global project is 5.8 billion euros in all three Baltic States according to the Cost-Benefit Study carried out by EY in 2017.

The feasibility study of Rail Baltica in the three Baltic States carried out by AECOM in 2011 had estimated cost of 3.6 billion euros for the railway and proved that Rail Baltica is economically viable. Based on that study, key political and practical decisions – both on the national and EU level – were made to implement Rail Baltica.

Since the AECOM study the project has matured, and essential elements have subsequently been added to the Rail Baltica Global Project for better connectivity, passenger mobility and inter-modality. Additions to the Global Project include routing the Rail Baltica passenger mainline through the Riga International Airport and construction of the airport passenger station (Latvia), the Kaunas–Vilnius connection (Lithuania), an improved connection in Kaunas (Lithuania), and construction of the tram line "Ülemiste-Tallinn airport" (Estonia). Moreover, the Environmental Impact Assessments, spatial planning and some preliminary designs have been prepared allowing to better estimate the investments needed for the project.

Thus, in April 2017, the overall cost of the Rail Baltica Global Project implementation in three countries, including the construction of the Kaunas-Vilnius section, was estimated at about €5.8 billion. According to the Ernst & Young (EY) cost-benefit analysis, the project's economic feasibility and benefits society will gain was proved, providing the necessary updated parameters for continued EU and national co-financing of the project.

The project's profitability lies in its wider socio-economic benefits, which are estimated by EY at around €16.22 billion. In addition, there will be several immeasurable (mostly, catalytic) benefits that would be created by Rail Baltica through regional integration, tourism development, new business creation, increased attractiveness to FDI, access to new export markets, technological transfer, innovation, etc.

The project is financed by the member states and the European Union TEN-T budget, and the Structural and Cohesion Funds provided to the EU New Member States. By the start of 2018, the three Baltic States and RB RAIL AS have received two grants designed under the CEF for the construction of the Rail Baltica railway, having signed Grant Agreements with a total value of 765 million euros. As of 13 July, third Grant agreement was signed for the total amount of 130 million euros from which 110 million euros is CEF contribution.

In July 2020, another CEF funding was received, amounting to EUR 216 million for construction, technical design and planning works, therefore the project has received around EUR 1.2 billion from the EU and national funds.

Route and standard

The planning phase of Rail Baltica took place from 2010 to 2017. In 2011, the three Baltic States agreed on a route connecting Tallinn, Pärnu, Riga, Panevėžys, and Kaunas. A feasibility study for this option estimated the line will cost about €3.68 billion in total.

During the planning of the location of the project route in the Baltic States a conceptual agreement among the three Baltic States was reached that it should be as straight as possible as it provides the highest benefits at the lowest cost. The shorter and more direct the route is, the faster traffic it is possible to ensure, which economically has the highest advantage compared to its alternatives. This was confirmed by the AECOM study in 2013, analysing the four possible options of the location of the route in all three Baltic countries.

Initially two options were considered. For the remainder of the route to Tallinn two different options were considered:
 Option one was to upgrade the existing railway from Joniškis via Riga and Tartu to Tallinn to 160 km/h, keeping the current Russian gauge and state-owned, and a new railway from Kaunas–Joniškis with 160 km/h, also at Russian gauge and state-owned. Because of the break of gauge at Kaunas, passengers would have to change trains there. For freight, a reloading facility or a bogie exchange station would be placed near Kaunas. This option was already completed as Rail Baltica I.
 Option two was a new railway with  speed standard gauge (with 3 kV DC, the same voltage as in Poland) from Kaunas via Joniškis to Riga, as above, but then continuing in a shorter, straighter line via Pärnu to Tallinn. This option was chosen as the preferred route. The existing Lelle-Pärnu line in Estonia was permanently closed for passenger operations on 9 December 2018, as it required a €17 million refurbishment.

The Šiauliai-to-Latvian border rail section (using broad gauge) was newly built and scheduled to be finished in 2015 with an estimated cost of €270 million. In Latvia, the existing railway upgrade between Riga and Valka was finished in 2016 at a cost of €97 million. The EU contributed about 25% of the cost for the three parts.

Construction (2017–present) 

In 2017, the parliaments of the three Baltic States ratified the intergovernmental agreement on Rail Baltica stating "route shall be from Tallinn though Pärnu–Riga–Panevezys–Kaunas to the Lithuanian/Polish state border with a connection of Vilnius–Kaunas as a part of the railway" and defining the design speed 240 km/h for passenger travel. Now the Rail Baltica Global Project route is aligned from Tallinn till Kaunas with already built European gauge railway line section from Kaunas to Lithuanian/Polish border being subject to the results of the Upgrade Feasibility Study. Nevertheless, in April 2018 the Ministries of the three Baltic States approved the Design Guidelines of Rail Baltica, which states that the maximum design speed will be 249 km/h and maximum operational speed should be 234 km/h.

For the Kaunas (Jiesia) - Lithuanian-Polish border section, a 78.1 km route named "alternative 6A" was approved in May 2022 by the Lithuanian Ministry of Transport and Communications, taking into account the opinion of the majority of the local residents. This optimal route is the shortest among the alternatives which were proposed and the most remote from the urban areas.

The Polish section of Rail Baltica is being upgraded to allow passenger trains to run at 200 km/h, the Ełk–state border section may be built to allow 250 km/h and may be electrified using the 25 kV AC system.

Rail Baltica I
The name Rail Baltica is also sometimes used to mean the first phase of European gauge railway construction from the Poland-Lithuania border to Kaunas in Lithuania. It was inaugurated on 16 October 2015. The project, which built European standard-gauge one track alongside the existing Russian gauge tracks, cost €380m. The 119 km line accommodates diesel trains, with passenger trains running at up to 120 km/h and freight trains at up to 80 km/h. Higher speeds will depend on future electrification, a new signal system and more level crossing gates. In June 2016, Lithuanian Railways and Polregio started weekend passenger train service between Kaunas and Białystok.

In Estonia and Latvia, implementation of the Rail Baltica I project included upgrades of the existing rail lines in the region. The  Russian gauge line from Tartu to Valga (on the Latvian border) in Estonia was renovated between 2008 and 2010. The work was done by the Finnish VR Group for a cost of €40M.

Benefits
The Baltic railway infrastructure will be connected to the European railway corridor, ensuring high-speed passenger travel and freight movement. Rail Baltica creates the possibility to shift the major freight transport in the regions from road to rail, which is currently being transported towards Russia and then north by heavy trucks. In the case of Poland, trucks follow local roads and directly cross the villages of Podlaskie Voivodeship.

According to the Cost-Benefit Study by Ernst&Young made in (2017), the benefits from Rail Baltica are calculated as:

 7.1 billion euros saved in climate change and noise reduction
 relevant track traffic flow shift to railways – 30-40%
 13,000 jobs created during the construction phase
 5.3 billion euros saved for passenger and freight travel
 5.3 million passenger hours saved
 400 human lives saved in 29 years

All in total, measurable socio-economic benefits are estimated at 16.2 billion euros. The assessed GDP multiplier effect the Rail Baltica Global Project would create is an additional 2 billion euros. It is also claimed there will be "substantial unmeasurable benefits".

In late April 2022, implementers of the Rail Baltica project presented the progress at the European Parliament where the strategic and geopolitical security importance of the project was stressed repeatedly referring to the 2022 Russian invasion of Ukraine.

Criticism

Criticism started after a feasibility study by AECOM was published, with the government of Lithuania keen to include a link to Vilnius. The mayor of Tartu, Estonia's second-largest city, called for the city to be included in the route.

In 2013, the Estonian Association for the Club of Rome advised the government to abandon the Rail Baltica route. Problems in the environmental assessment programme have also been claimed.

In 2017, two Estonian environmental groups claimed that the lack of public participation on the decision made by Baltic governments and building of a new line, rather than upgrading the existing network, is in conflict with the Aarhus Convention.

In 2016 and 2017, three open letters were composed in Estonia which called on the Estonian government and parliament to stop the project in its planned form. The main arguments in these letters were that the new track as a greenfield project will cause too much damage to nature and does not essentially improve travel possibilities.

On 8 June 2017, Priit Humal, Karli Lambot, Illimar Paul and Raul Vibo, experts on logistics and engineering, published a critical analysis of the Rail Baltica Cost-Benefit Analysis made by EY (formerly Ernst & Young) where they claimed that €4.1 billion of the stated socio-economic benefits are faulty and therefore the Rail Baltica project is neither feasible nor eligible for EU financing. They asked for comments from RB RAIL AS, the Rail Baltica coordinator, who provided answers four months later. The authors of the first study claimed that the issues raised in their previous analysis were not adequately addressed in the official replies and that therefore Rail Baltica will be detrimental to society.

The authors of the critical analysis have been accused of having a conflict of interest, as one of the authors owns a logistics company. It has been claimed that Rail Baltic would decrease the volume of business for road transport businesses. The author has denied these claims.

See also
 Via Baltica (E67)
 Helsinki to Tallinn Tunnel
 Rail transport in Estonia
 Rail transport in Latvia
 Rail transport in Lithuania
 Rail transport in Poland
 Rail transport in the European Union
 Pan-European Corridor I

References

External links

 Official website – Global Project
 European Commission: Progress report on Rail Baltica compiled by the European coordinator of the project Pavel Telička, July 2007 – July 2008
 Information about Rail Baltica on the TEN-T website of Greens/EFA in the European Parliament 
 European Commission: Feasibility study on Rail Baltica railways – Main conclusions and recommendations January 2007
 European Commission: Feasibility study on Rail Baltica railways – Annexes January 2007
 Priority Project 27 
 Baltic countries' agreement on Rail Baltica project to be signed at the beginning of summer

Rail transport in Estonia
Rail transport in Latvia
Rail transport in Lithuania
Rail infrastructure in Poland
Proposed rail infrastructure in Europe
Higher-speed rail
High-speed rail in Europe
Proposed transport infrastructure in Estonia
Proposed transport infrastructure in Latvia
Proposed transport infrastructure in Lithuania
Projects of the Three Seas Initiative